Manuel Bustos (born 9 September 1992) is an Argentine professional footballer who plays as a forward for Ben Hur.

Career
Bustos' career started with Libertad of Torneo Federal A. He made his debut on 3 April 2016 in a Sunchales derby against Unión Sunchales. Bustos scored four goals in nine appearances during the 2016–17 season, he was then signed by Argentine Primera División club Atlético de Rafaela in early 2017. However, following squad changes by manager Juan Manuel Llop, Bustos was unneeded and subsequently loaned back to Libertad. He went onto make nine appearances back with Libertad, scoring four times. He returned to Rafaela for the 2017–18 Primera B Nacional under new manager Lucas Bovaglio.

He made his professional debut on 15 September 2017 versus Gimnasia y Esgrima (J), scoring his first Rafaela goal in the process in a 0–2 win. Bustos joined Torneo Federal A side Sportivo Belgrano in September 2018. Two goals in nineteen appearances followed in 2018–19. July 2019 saw Bustos join fellow third tier team Gimnasia y Esgrima. He made his first appearance for the Concepción del Uruguay club on 1 September against San Martín de Formosa, before scoring against Crucero del Norte on 19 October. On 16 January 2020, Bustos signed for Ben Hur of Torneo Regional Federal Amateur.

Career statistics
.

References

External links

1992 births
Living people
Footballers from Santa Fe, Argentina
Argentine footballers
Association football forwards
Torneo Federal A players
Argentine Primera División players
Primera Nacional players
Libertad de Sunchales footballers
Atlético de Rafaela footballers
Sportivo Belgrano footballers
Gimnasia y Esgrima de Concepción del Uruguay footballers
Club Sportivo Ben Hur players